Saltag-Tas is a mountain in the Ust-Yansky District, Sakha Republic (Yakutia), Russia. At  it is the highest mountain in the Selennyakh Range, part of the wider Chersky Range (Momsko-Chersk Region), East Siberian System.

See also
List of mountains in Russia
List of ultras of Northeast Asia

References

External links
The highest peaks in Russia

Mountains of the Sakha Republic
Chersky Range